Countdown (originally known as 6:42) is a 2016 American action film starring Dolph Ziggler, Katharine Isabelle and Kane. The film is directed by John Stockwell and written by Richard Wenk and Michael Finch and produced by WWE Studios. It was released direct-to-video and Digital HD by Lionsgate on April 5, 2016.

Plot
Ray Thompson, a narcotics cop recently back on duty after a suspension, receives a package at the station. This leads to a website that shows a madman holding a child hostage. The child has timed explosives strapped to his body. Lt. Cronin arranges to pay the $2,000,112.35 ransom demanded by this criminal and makes Ray the bagman. When the exchange is bungled, Ray shoots and kills the madman before he sets the explosives off. Ray has to team up with Internal Affairs agent Julia Baker to locate the child before it's too late.

Cast
Dolph Ziggler as Ray Thompson 
Katharine Isabelle as Lieutenant Julia Baker
Josh Blacker as Detective Al Kendricks
Kane as Lieutenant Frank Cronin
Rusev as himself (cameo)
Lana as herself (cameo)
Alexander Kalugin  as Nikolai 
Michael Kopsa as Makarov 
Alan O'Silva as Vladislav Pavel
Catherine Lough Haggquist as Lilly  
Jennifer Cheon as Rachel
Luke Roessler as Anatoli
Taras as Long-Haired Thug 
Alexander 'Sasha' Mandra as Boris
Sarwan Badesha as Technician #1
Simon Hill as Technician #2

Jimmy Uso, Jey Uso, Roman Reigns, Santino Marella, Dean Ambrose, Curtis Axel, Mark Henry, Big Show, Daniel Bryan, Heath Slater, Randy Orton, Charles Robinson, Big E, Kofi Kingston, Xavier Woods, Viktor, Konnor, Sin Cara,  Kalisto, Brock Lesnar, and Paul Heyman are all uncredited.

References

External links

WWE Studios films
2016 action films
Direct-to-video action films
American action films
2010s English-language films
Films with screenplays by Richard Wenk
2010s American films